St Mary's Convent Girls High School is a Kerala Government aided Christian school run by CMC Sisters, located in Ollur, Thrissur.

References

Girls' schools in Kerala
High schools and secondary schools in Kerala
Christian schools in Kerala
Schools in Thrissur
Syro-Malabar Catholic Church